The Disney Legends Awards is a Hall of Fame program that recognizes individuals who have made an extraordinary and integral contribution to The Walt Disney Company. Established in 1987, the honor was traditionally awarded annually during a special private ceremony. Today, it has been awarded biennially during Disney's D23 Expo since 2009.

Having been honoured in 1998, Glynis Johns currently holds the record for the oldest living and longest surviving Disney Legend.

Criteria  
Recipients are chosen by a selection committee, formerly appointed and chaired by Disney Legend Roy E. Disney, Walt Disney's nephew, former vice chairman and director emeritus of The Walt Disney Company. The committee consists of long-time Disney executives, historians, and other authorities. Besides the award statuette itself, each honoree is represented by a bronze commemorative plaque featuring the recipients' handprints and signature if they were living when inducted, or simply an image of the statuette emblem if the induction was posthumous. The plaques are placed on display in Legends Plaza at the Walt Disney Studios in Burbank, California, across from the Michael D. Eisner Building.

The award 

Imagineer Andrea Favilli created the Disney Legends award, which is handcrafted from bronze each year. The award depicts the arm of Mickey Mouse holding a star-tipped wand.

Disney describes the award as follows:

The Disney Legends award has three distinct elements that characterize the contributions made by each talented recipient.
The Spiral ... stands for imagination, the power of an idea.
The Hand ... holds the gifts of skill, discipline and craftsmanship.
The Wand and the Star ... represent magic: the spark that is ignited when imagination and skill combine to create a new dream.

The first Disney Legends committee consisted of Dave Smith; Arlene Ludwig; Marty Sklar, Randy Bright; Jack Lindquist; Sharon Harwood; Art Levitt; Shelley Miles; Paula Sigman; Doris Smith; and Stacia Martin.

In 2017 Kermit the Frog Muppeteer Steve Whitmire alleged that the company offered him "consolation prizes" including the Disney Legends award in return for keeping quiet about the details surrounding his termination.

Recipients



 = awarded posthumously

1980s

Class of 1987
 Fred MacMurray, Film

Class of 1989
 Les Clark, Animation 
 Marc Davis, Animation & Imagineering
 Ub Iwerks, Animation & Imagineering 
 Ollie Johnston, Animation
 Milt Kahl, Animation 
 Ward Kimball, Animation & Imagineering
 Eric Larson, Animation 
 John Lounsbery, Animation 
 Wolfgang Reitherman, Animation 
 Frank Thomas, Animation

All except Iwerks were Disney's "Nine Old Men".

1990s

Class of 1990
 Roger Broggie, Imagineering
 Joe Fowler, Attractions
 John Hench, Animation & Imagineering
 Richard Irvine, Imagineering 
 Herb Ryman, Imagineering 
 Sherman Brothers, Music

Class of 1991
 Ken Anderson, Animation & Imagineering
 Julie Andrews, Film
 Carl Barks, Animation & Publishing
 Mary Blair, Animation & Imagineering 
 Claude Coats, Animation & Imagineering
 Don DaGradi, Animation & Film
 Sterling Holloway, Animation—Voice
 Fess Parker, Film & Television
 Bill Walsh, Film & Television

Class of 1992
 Jimmie Dodd, Television 
 Bill Evans, Imagineering
 Annette Funicello, Film & Television
 Joe Grant, Animation
 Jack Hannah, Animation
 Winston Hibler, Film 
 Ken O'Connor, Animation & Imagineering
 Roy Williams, Animation & Television

Class of 1993
 Pinto Colvig, Animation—Voice 
 Buddy Ebsen, Film & Television
 Peter Ellenshaw, Film
 Blaine Gibson, Animation & Imagineering
 Harper Goff, Film & Imagineering
 Irving Ludwig, Film
 Jimmy MacDonald, Animation—Voice 
 Clarence Nash, Animation—Voice 
 Donn Tatum, Administration
 Card Walker, Administration

Class of 1994
 Adriana Caselotti, Animation—Voice
 Bill Cottrell, Animation & Imagineering
 Marvin Davis, Film & Imagineering
 Van France, Attractions
 David Hand, Animation 
 Jack Lindquist, Attractions
 Bill Martin, Imagineering
 Paul J. Smith, Music 
 Frank Wells, Administration

Class of 1995
 Wally Boag, Attractions
 Fulton Burley, Attractions
 Dean Jones, Film
 Angela Lansbury, Film
 Edward Meck, Attractions 
 Fred Moore, Animation 
 Thurl Ravenscroft, Animation—Voice
 Wathel Rogers, Imagineering
 Betty Taylor, Attractions

Class of 1996
 Bob Allen, Attractions 
 Rex Allen, Film & Television
 X Atencio, Animation & Imagineering
 Betty Lou Gerson, Animation—Voice
 Bill Justice, Animation & Imagineering
 Bob Matheison, Attractions
Sam McKim, Imagineering
 Bob Moore, Animation & Film
 Bill Peet, Animation—Story

Class of 1997
 Lucien Adés, Music 
 Angel Angelopoulos, Publishing 
 Antonio Bertini, Character Merchandise
 Armand Bigle, Character Merchandise
 Gaudenzio Capelli, Publishing
 Roberto de Leonardis, Film 
 Cyril Edgar, Film 
 Wally Feignoux, Film 
 Didier Fouret, Publishing 
 Mario Gentilini, Publishing 
 Cyril James, Film & Merchandise 
 Horst Koblischek, Character Merchandise
 Gunnar Mansson, Character Merchandise
 Arnoldo Mondadori, Publishing 
 Armand Palivoda, Film 
 Poul Brahe Pedersen, Publishing 
 Joe Potter, Attractions 
 André Vanneste, Character Merchandise 
 Paul Winkler, Character Merchandise

Class of 1998
 James Algar, Animation & Film
 Buddy Baker, Music
 Kathryn Beaumont, Animation—Voice
 Virginia Davis, Animation
 Don Escen, Administration
 Wilfred Jackson, Animation 
 Glynis Johns, Film
 Kay Kamen, Character Merchandise 
 Paul Kenworthy, Film
 Larry Lansburgh, Film & Television
 Hayley Mills, Film
 Al Milotte and Elma Milotte, Film 
 Norman "Stormy" Palmer, Film
 Lloyd Richardson, Film
 Kurt Russell, Film
 Ben Sharpsteen, Animation & Film 
 Masatomo Takahashi, Administration
 Vladimir (Bill) Tytla, Animation 
 Dick Van Dyke, Film
 Matsuo Yokoyama, Character Merchandise

Class of 1999
 Tim Allen, Television, Film & Animation—Voice
 Mary Costa, Animation—Voice
 Norm Ferguson, Animation 
 Bill Garity, Film 
 Yale Gracey, Animation & Imagineering 
 Al Konetzni, Character Merchandise
 Hamilton Luske, Animation 
 Dick Nunis, Attractions
 Charlie Ridgway, Attractions

2000s

Class of 2000
 Grace Bailey, Animation 
 Harriet Burns, Imagineering
 Joyce Carlson, Animation & Imagineering
 Ron Dominguez, Parks & Resorts
 Cliff Edwards, Animation—Voice 
 Becky Fallberg, Animation
 Dick Jones, Animation—Voice
 Dodie Roberts, Animation
 Retta Scott, Animation 
 Ruthie Tompson, Animation

Class of 2001
 Howard Ashman, Music 
 Bob Broughton, Film
 George Bruns, Music 
 Frank Churchill, Music 
 Leigh Harline, Music 
 Fred Joerger, Imagineering
 Alan Menken, Music
 Martin Sklar, Imagineering
 Ned Washington, Music 
 Tyrus Wong, Animation

Class of 2002
Note: In honor of the opening of the Walt Disney Studios Park at Disneyland Paris, all 2002 inductees are of European origin. The ceremony was held in the Animation building at the new park on opening day.
 Ken Annakin, Film
 Hugh Attwooll, Film
 Maurice Chevalier, Film 
 Phil Collins, Music
 Sir John Mills, Film
 Robert Newton, Film & Television 
 Sir Tim Rice, Music
 Robert Stevenson, Film 
 Richard Todd, Film & Television
 David Tomlinson, Film

Class of 2003
Following a dispute between Roy E. Disney and the company that resulted in Disney departing, Robert Iger, the company's then-president and COO co-presented with Michael Eisner.
 Neil Beckett, Merchandise 
 Tutti Camarata, Music
 Edna Francis Disney 
 Lillian Disney 
 Orlando Ferrante, Imagineering
 Richard Fleischer, Film
 Floyd Gottfredson, Animation 
 Buddy Hackett, Film & Television 
 Harrison "Buzz" Price, Research Economist
 Al Taliaferro, Cartoonist 
 Ilene Woods, Music—Voice

Class of 2004
 Bill Anderson, Film & Television 
 Tim Conway, Film
 Rolly Crump, Imagineering
 Alice Davis, Imagineering
 Karen Dotrice, Film & Television
 Matthew Garber, Film 
 Leonard H. Goldenson, Television 
 Bob Gurr, Imagineering
 Ralph Kent, Imagineering & Attractions
 Irwin Kostal, Music 
 Mel Shaw, Animation

Class of 2005
In honor of Disneyland's 50th anniversary in 2005, all recipients are related to either Walt Disney Parks and Resorts and/or Walt Disney Imagineering, and nearly all have had some connection with Disneyland. Roy E. Disney again co-presented the awards, after a two-year hiatus and a return to the company.
 Chuck Abbott, Parks & Resorts 
 Milt Albright, Parks & Resorts
 Hideo Amemiya, Parks & Resorts 
 Hideo Aramaki, Parks & Resorts 
 Charles Boyer, Parks & Resorts
 Randy Bright, Imagineering 
 James Cora, Parks & Resorts
 Robert Jani, Parks & Resorts 
 Mary Jones, Parks & Resorts
 Art Linkletter, Parks & Resorts
 Mary Anne Mang, Parks & Resorts
 Steve Martin, Parks & Resorts
 Tom Nabbe, Parks & Resorts
 Jack Olsen, Parks & Resorts 
 Cicely Rigdon, Parks & Resorts
 William Sullivan, Parks & Resorts
 Jack Wagner, Parks & Resorts 
 Vesey Walker, Parks & Resorts

Class of 2006
 Tim Considine, Television & Film
 Kevin Corcoran, Television & Film
 Al Dempster, Animation 
 Don Edgren, Imagineering
 Paul Frees, Television, Film & Parks 
 Peter Jennings, Television 
 Sir Elton John, Music
 Jimmy Johnson, Music 
 Tommy Kirk, Television & Film
 Joe Ranft, Animation 
 David Stollery, Television & Film
 Ginny Tyler, Television & Film

Class of 2007
 Roone Arledge, Television 
 Art Babbitt, Animation 
 Carl Bongirno, Imagineering
 Marge Champion, Animation
 Dick Huemer, Animation 
 Ron Logan, Parks & Resorts
 Lucille Martin, Administration
 Tom Murphy, Administration
 Randy Newman, Music
 Floyd Norman, Animation
 Bob Schiffer, Film Production
 Dave Smith, Archives

Class of 2008
 Wayne Allwine, Animation—Voice
 Bob Booth, Attractions
 Roy E. Disney, Film, Animation & Administration
 Neil Gallagher, Attractions
 Frank Gifford, Television
 Burny Mattinson, Animation
 Walter Peregoy, Animation
 Dorothea Redmond, Designer
 Russi Taylor, Animation—Voice
 Toshio Kagami, Parks and Resorts
 Ian McGuinness, - Animation  & Entertainment 
 Barbara Walters, Television
 Oliver Wallace, Music

Class of 2009
 Tony Anselmo, Animation—Voice
 Harry Archinal, Administration
 Beatrice Arthur, Film & Television 
 Bill Farmer, Animation—Voice
 Estelle Getty, Film & Television 
 Don Iwerks, Film
 Rue McClanahan, Film & Television
 Leota Toombs Thomas, Attractions 
 Betty White, Film & Television
 Robin Williams, Film & Animation—Voice

2010s

Class of 2011
 Regis Philbin, Television
 Jim Henson, Film & Television 
 Jodi Benson, Animation—Voice
 Paige O'Hara, Animation—Voice
 Lea Salonga, Animation—Voice
 Linda Larkin, Animation—Voice
 Anika Noni Rose, Animation—Voice
 Jack Wrather, Parks & Resorts 
 Bonita Wrather, Film 
 Guy Williams, Television 
 Bo Boyd, Consumer Products
 Raymond Watson, Administration

Class of 2013
 Tony Baxter, Imagineering
 Collin Campbell, Imagineering 
 Dick Clark, Television 
 Billy Crystal, Film & Animation—Voice
 John Goodman, Film & Animation—Voice
 Steve Jobs, Animation 
 Glen Keane, Animation
 Ed Wynn, Film & Animation—Voice

Class of 2015
 George Bodenheimer, Administration & Television
 Andreas Deja, Animation
 Johnny Depp, Film
 Eyvind Earle, Animation 
 Danny Elfman, Music
 George Lucas, Film & Parks and Resorts
 Susan Lucci, Television
 Julie Reihm Casaletto, Parks and Resorts
 Carson Van Osten, Consumer Products

Class of 2017
 Carrie Fisher, Film 
 Clyde Geronimi, Animation 
 Whoopi Goldberg, Film & Television
 Manuel Gonzales, Animation 
 Mark Hamill, Film
 Wayne Jackson, Imagineering
 Jack Kirby, Publishing 
 Stan Lee, Film & Publishing
 Garry Marshall, Film & Television 
 Julie Taymor, Theatrical
 Oprah Winfrey, Film & Television

Class of 2019

 Christina Aguilera, Music & Television
 Wing T. Chao, Parks & Resorts
 Robert Downey Jr., Film
 James Earl Jones, Film
 Jon Favreau, Film
 Bette Midler, Film
 Kenny Ortega, Film & Television
 Barnette Ricci, Parks & Resorts
 Robin Roberts, Television
 Diane Sawyer, Television
 Ming-Na Wen, Film, Television & Animation—Voice
 Hans Zimmer, Music

2020s

Class of 2022

Anthony Anderson, Film & Television
Kristen Bell, Film & Animation—Voice
Chadwick Boseman, Film
Rob't Coltrin, Parks & Resorts
Patrick Dempsey, Film & Television
Robert Price "Bob" Foster, Administration
Josh Gad, Film & Animation—Voice
Jonathan Groff, Film & Animation—Voice
Don Hahn, Animation
Doris Hardoon, Imagineering
Idina Menzel, Film & Animation—Voice
Chris Montan, Music
Ellen Pompeo, Television
Tracee Ellis Ross, Television

References

External links
 Disney Legends on D23
 Coverage of the 2005 Disney Legends awards presentation
 Interview with the founder of the Disney Legends awards

The Walt Disney Company
Halls of fame in California
Media museums in California
Burbank, California
Awards established in 1987
 
Entertainment halls of fame
Lifetime achievement awards